Batesville High School may refer to:

Batesville High School (Arkansas), Batesville, Arkansas
Batesville High School (Indiana), Batesville, Indiana